Adolphe Brune, was a French artist born in Paris in 1802 and painted religious subjects, portraits, still life, and mural compositions.  He studied under Gros, and made his debut at the Salon in 1833 with an 'Adoration of the Magi.' He was subsequently employed on various public buildings. He decorated the 'Salle des Séances' of the Senate in the Luxembourg, and the ceiling of the Bibliothèque of the Louvre. Brune died in 1880.

Works
He has three tables in the hall of the palace of the Senate (1861), the ceiling of the new library at the Louvre (1861), the painting of the chapel of St. Catherine in the Saint-Roch church in Paris and in the galleries of Versailles, the portraits of Louis XII, of Charles IX, of Claude Annebaut, Paul de la Barthe, of Ney.

Notes

References
 

19th-century French painters
French male painters
1802 births
1880 deaths
Painters from Paris
Pupils of Antoine-Jean Gros
19th-century French male artists